The 1955–56 Yugoslav First League season was the tenth season of the First Federal League (Serbian: Prva savezna liga, Croatian: Prva savezna liga), the top level association football competition of SFR Yugoslavia, since its establishment in 1946. Fourteen teams contested the competition, with Red Star winning their third title.

Teams
At the end of the previous season Lokomotiva and Vardar were relegated from top level. They were replaced by Velež and Budućnost Titograd.

League table

Results

Winning squad
Champions:
RED STAR BELGRADE (coach: Milovan Ćirić)

players (league matches/league goals):
Rajko Mitić (25/4)
Lazar Tasić (25/4)
Ivan Toplak (24/12)
Antun Rudinski (24/6)
Ljubomir Spajić (23/0)
Dragoslav Šekularac (22/6)
Branko Stanković (20/1)
Srboljub Krivokuća (19/0) -goalkeeper-
Borivoje Kostić (17/14)
Vladimir Popović (17/2)
Branko Nešović (17/0)
Miljan Zeković (17/0)
Todor Živanović (12/9)
Vladimir Durković (7/1)
Vladimir Beara (7/0) -goalkeeper-
Jovan Cokić (5/2)
Miljan Miljanić (2/0)
Novak Tomić (2/0)
Stevan Veselinov (1/0)

Top scorers

See also
1955–56 Yugoslav Second League
1955 Yugoslav Cup

External links
Yugoslavia Domestic Football Full Tables

Yugoslav First League seasons
Yugo
1